Daystar is a Christian liberal arts university in Nairobi.

Daystar's original campus is close to Nairobi city centre, but there was no room to expand at that location.  Therefore, in 1992 a new campus was  built at Athi River, some 40 km to the south-east of the city, on the Mombasa Road which became the main campus.

History
Daystar’s story began with an American couple making a decision to become missionaries in South Africa. Towards the end of October 1952, the newly married couple - Don and Faye Smith - sailed to Cape Town, South Africa to teach at the Evangelical Teacher Training College. Dr Motsoko Pheko was a co-founder of Daystar University. Then in 1956, four years after they arrived, the South African government took over all mission schools. This included the college where the Smiths worked. Consequently, Don and Faye were commissioned to develop Christian literature for evangelising as appointees of the South African General Mission (SAGM) Board Proprietor of the Natal College.
 
Don became the head of all SAGM literature work and the couple moved to the SAGM Mission Headquarters in Roodepoort, Transvaal, a suburb of Johannesburg where they began a publishing house called the Africa Christian Literature Advance (ACLA). From the outset, Don’s aim was to train African workers to handle much of the work – writing, artwork and the like. So they started out with only four workers – the Smiths and two African alumni of the Evangelical Teacher Training College (ETTC).  

One of their first publications was Our Africa, a monthly Christian magazine launched in September 1958. The African team members - Earnest Pheko and Edmund Khumalo – played an integral role in the planning. Pheko was one of the first African officers whom Don trained and he later became the magazine’s managing editor. Unfortunately, five years after the launch, on April 4, 1963, he was arrested by the South African authorities and accused of working against the white government.

In the next year, after Pheko was released, he and Don began a Christian literature publishing house which they called Daystar Publications. They wanted it to be more Afrocentric than mission-controlled. Pheko was in charge because Don travelled so much, and he was the one who came up with the name ‘Daystar’. In an interview, he recalled how he came up with it.

“I read the Bible and of course I also grew up as a shepherd. Therefore, I knew that by day a shepherd has all the light he needs but at night he relies on the light of the stars. So the shepherd and his flock are really never in the dark and appear to be coming out of darkness.” 

Thus, Daystar’s role was to shepherd men and women both by day and by night. Its purpose was to transform (wo)men from the inside out, to ensure their hearts were right with God, and their intellect was well tuned and equipped to serve society. 

From 1966, Don and Pheko worked together to build Daystar Publications in Zambia and Zimbabwe (then Northern and Southern Rhodesia). However, due to restrictive government policies the environment was not conducive for them to work. In that year, Don and Faye went back to America to study. They returned in 1969, and in November of that year Don launched Daystar Communications, a research and training ministry that responded to African ministry needs. Daystar Publications thus became known as Daystar Communications. Part of Daystar Communications’ role was to train and it held two initial trainings, the first in 1971 at Ranche House College in Harare, Zimbabwe (then Salisbury, Southern Rhodesia), and the second in June 1972 at the Brakenhurst Baptist Conference Centre in Limuru, Kenya.
 
In 1973, the Smiths visited Nairobi, Kenya to purchase property for Daystar Communications. They had just received a special gift of US$100,000 from Kenneth Taylor, the founder of Living Bibles International. In Nairobi, they found that Shell Oil was selling its property, which was right next to Nairobi Baptist Church. They decided to buy the two-storey stone house, which had with 10 bedrooms above and a three-room flat below. Behind the house there was a lecture room with an office attached. This modest property became the Daystar Communications campus. And on July 7, 1973, Daystar Communications was incorporated as a limited company in Kenya. 

Between 1974 and 1978 the Smiths commenced training programmes in Nairobi, completed several major research and consultation projects, launched a two-year communications diploma at the Associate’s Art level, and formed the Afro-Asia Board to run Daystar Communications. Exactly one-and-a-half years after the constitution of the Afro-Asian Board, on January 4, 1978, the directors held a meeting and resolved to develop undergraduate and graduate programmes, and launch a graduate seminary. This would be in addition to the undergraduate, diploma programme that was already being offered under the International Institute of Christian Communication. 

In 1984, the undergraduate programme was launched in collaboration with Wheaton and Messiah Colleges in the US. With the support of both the Afro-Asian and American boards, Don began to plan for the launch of an Africa-based Bachelor of Arts programme, and in April 1984, Daystar launched the four-year Baccalaureate degree programme in collaboration with Messiah College. In November of the same year, the Daystar International Institute of Christian Communication changed its name to Daystar University College and formed a Governing Council to replace the existing Afro-Asian Board.

Ten years later, in 1994, Daystar celebrated a very memorable day. Daystar University College was awarded a charter and became Daystar University, making the institution an independent university with all the attendant rights and privileges. With the charter, it was officially authorised to grant its own degrees, diplomas and other awards. Daystar has continued to grow since then.

Academics 
It has seven schools and fifteen academic departments which include

School of Communication
 Language and Performing Arts
 Media and Film Studies
 Strategic and Organizational Communication

School of Arts and Humanities
 Education
 Theology and Biblical Studies
 Peace and International Studies

School of Science, Engineering and Health
 Science and Engineering
 Computer Science

School of Human and Social Sciences
 Development Studies
 Psychology and Counseling
 Institute of Child Development

School of Business and Economics
 Commerce
 Economics
 Institute of Leadership and Professional Development

School of Law
 Media & Communication Law

School of Nursing
 Midwifery and Reproductive Health Nursing
 Community Health Nursing

Prominent alumni
Biko Adema – rugby player
Collins Injera – rugby player
Larry Madowo – journalist
Rebecca Joshua Okwaci – South Sudanese politician

References

External links 
 Official Web Site
 Daystar's Department of Language and Performing Arts
 Engage: Discourses on Kenyan Literature written by Larry Ndivo

 
Universities in Kenya
Education in Nairobi
Christian education in Kenya
Religious organisations based in Kenya
Private universities and colleges in Kenya